Barbara Sobotta (née Janiszewska; December 4, 1936 in Poznań – November 20, 2000 in Kraków) was a Polish athlete who mainly competed in the women's sprint events during her career.

In 1958 in Stockholm, she won the European Championships 200 metres race (as Maria Leontyavna Itkina won the bronze medal).

She competed for Poland at the 1960 Summer Olympics held in Rome, Italy where she won the bronze medal in the women's 4 x 100 metres with her teammates Teresa Wieczorek, Celina Jesionowska and Halina Richter.

Additional images

References

1936 births
2000 deaths
Sportspeople from Poznań
Polish female sprinters
Olympic athletes of Poland
Olympic bronze medalists for Poland
Athletes (track and field) at the 1956 Summer Olympics
Athletes (track and field) at the 1960 Summer Olympics
Athletes (track and field) at the 1964 Summer Olympics
European Athletics Championships medalists
Medalists at the 1960 Summer Olympics
Olympic bronze medalists in athletics (track and field)
Universiade medalists in athletics (track and field)
Universiade gold medalists for Poland
Medalists at the 1961 Summer Universiade
Olympic female sprinters